is a trans-Neptunian object and possibly a cubewano from the outermost regions of the Solar System, approximately 480 kilometers in diameter. It was discovered on 11 January 2008, by American Michael E. Brown and Megan Schwamb at Palomar Observatory in California.

Description 

 orbits the Sun at a distance of 36.1–47.6 AU once every 270 years and 5 months (98,778 days; semi-major axis of 41.8 AU). Its orbit has an eccentricity of 0.14 and an inclination of 27° with respect to the ecliptic. It has 3 precovery observations back to 1989. Lightcurve analysis gave an ambiguous rotation period of 9.04 hours with a brightness amplitude of 0.12 magnitude.  has been identified as a member of the Haumea family in a dynamical study led by Proudfoot and Ragozzine in 2019.

Numbering and naming 

This minor planet was numbered by the Minor Planet Center on 7 February 2012. As of 2018, it has not been named.

References

External links 
 List of Known Trans-Neptunian Objects, Johnston's Archive
 Asteroid Lightcurve Database (LCDB), query form (info )
 Dictionary of Minor Planet Names, Google books
 Discovery Circumstances: Numbered Minor Planets (315001)-(320000) – Minor Planet Center
 
 

315530
315530
315530
315530
315530
Discoveries by Michael E. Brown
Discoveries by Megan E. Schwamb
20080111